The name Olympia may refer to:

Arts and entertainment

Film
 Olympia (1938 film), by Leni Riefenstahl, documenting the Berlin-hosted Olympic Games
 Olympia (1998 film), about a Mexican soap opera star who pursues a career as an athlete
 Olympia (2011 film), about an aspiring porn actress
 Olympia (2018 drama film), an American romantic drama
 Olympia (2018 documentary film), about the career of Academy Award-winning actress Olympia Dukakis

Music
 Olympia (musician), Australian art-pop singer-songwriter-guitarist Olivia Jayne Bartley (born 1982)
 Olympia (Bryan Ferry album)
 Olympia (Austra album)
 Olympia (EP), an EP by The Maybes?
 "Olympia" (song), a song by Sergio Mendes

Other arts and entertainment
 Olympia (Manet), an 1863 oil on canvas painting by Édouard Manet
 Olympia, a 1948 oil on canvas painting by René Magritte
 Olympia (comics), a fictional city in Marvel Comics
 Olympia, a mechanical doll in E. T. A. Hoffmann's short story "Der Sandmann", and in the opera The Tales of Hoffmann by Jacques Offenbach

Buildings and landmarks

 Olympia (Paris), a famous music hall in Paris, France
 Olympia London, an exhibition centre in London, UK
 Olympia Apartments (Washington, D.C.), U.S., listed on the National Register of Historic Places
 Olympia Building, Atlanta, location of an iconic Coca-Cola sign
 Detroit Olympia, the former stadium of the NHL's Detroit Red Wings
 Kensington (Olympia) station, a station in London, UK
 Liverpool Olympia, a theatre in Liverpool, UK
 Olympia Milk Bar, a cultural landmark in Sydney, Australia
 Olympia Theatre, Dublin, a concert hall in Dublin, Ireland
 Olympia Theatre (New York), a now-demolished theatre complex in New York City, U.S.
 Olympia (São Paulo), a former music venue in São Paulo, Brazil

Businesses
 , a British CD label active in the 1990s releasing material from the Soviet Union, Poland, the Netherlands and other countries
 Olympia Brewing Company (1896–2003), a brewery in Tumwater, Washington, U.S.
 Olympia Capital Holdings, a holding company for several African businessese
 Olympia Press, a French publisher
 Olympia and York, a now-bankrupt property firm based in Canada
 Olympia-Werke, a former major manufacturer of typewriters in Germany
 Olympia Sports, a sporting goods company

Military
 , ships of the Royal Navy
 , two US Navy ships named after the city of Olympia
 Olympia-class cruiser, a US Navy class of protected cruisers

Organisms
 Olympia, a section of the plant genus Hypericum (St. John's-worts)
 Olympia oyster, a Pacific coast oyster
 Euchloe olympia, a North American butterfly commonly called the Olympia Marble

People
 Olympia (given name)
 Olympia, a nickname for American professional bodybuilder Iris Kyle (born 1974)

Places

Greece
 Olympia, Greece, the site of the ancient Olympic Games
 Olympia Province, a former province of Greece

United States
 Olympia, Georgia, a ghost town
 Olympia, Kentucky, an unincorporated community
 Olympia, Missouri, an unincorporated community
 Olympia, South Carolina, a census-designated place
 Olympia, Washington, the state capital

Schools
 Olympia High School (disambiguation), several high schools in the United States
 Olympia College, a for-profit group of American colleges, part of the Everest College system

Sport

Sports clubs
 Olympia FC (disambiguation), several football clubs
 Olympia Club de Bruxelles, a former Belgian football club
 Olympia Sofia, a women's football club in Sofia, Bulgaria
 TSR Olympia Wilhelmshaven, a German sports club
 Olympia Larissa BC, a basketball club based in Larissa, Greece
 Olympia București, a football club based in Bucharest, Romania
 Olympia HC, a handball club in London, United Kingdom

Facilities
 Detroit Olympia, the former stadium of the National Hockey League's Detroit Red Wings
 Olympia Skistadion, a ski-jumping facility in Garmisch, Germany
 Olympia (Helsingborg), a football stadium in Helsingborg, Sweden
 Olympia Ice Center, a hockey rink in West Springfield, Massachusetts, United States
 Olympia Leisure Centre (1974), a former swimming pool in Dundee, Scotland
 Olympia Leisure Centre (2013), a swimming pool in Dundee, Scotland

Other sports
 Olympia (horse), an American Thoroughbred racehorse
 Mr. Olympia, an annual bodybuilding contest
 Ms. Olympia, an annual women's bodybuilding contest

Transportation

Maritime
 , a steamship that served the northwest United States and Alaska
 MV Olympia, original name of SPL Princess Anastasia (1986), a cruiseferry operated by Viking Line between 1986 and 1993
 Olympia, later MS Regal Empress, an ocean liner
 Olympia Terminal, a dock in the South Harbour of Helsinki, Finland

Other transportation
 Olympia Regional Airport, Olympia, Washington, United States, a public use airport
 EoN Olympia, a glider built in numbers in the 1940s in the United Kingdom
 Opel Olympia, a family car
 Olympia railway station, Olympia, Greece

Other uses
 582 Olympia, an asteroid
 Olympia Academy or "Akademie Olympia", a semi-formal group of friends that included Albert Einstein
 Walther Olympia, a 1936 semi-automatic handgun manufactured by Walther
 Olympia (ice resurfacer), a line of ice resurfacers manufactured by Resurfice Corporation

See also
 Olympiastadion (Berlin), a stadium originally built for the cancelled 1916 Summer Olympics
 Olympia Heights, Florida, United States
 Olympia Fields, Illinois, United States
 DFS Olympia Meise, a glider built in numbers in the 1930s in Germany
 Olympias (disambiguation)
 Olympic (disambiguation)
 Olympus (disambiguation)
 Olympe (disambiguation)
 Olimpia (disambiguation)
 Olimpija (disambiguation)